The 2019 Africa U-20 Cup of Nations is an international association football tournament held in Niger. The eight national teams involved in the tournament were required to register a squad of 21 players; only players in these squads are eligible to take part in the tournament. Each player had to have been born after 1 January 1999. All ages as of start of the tournament. The squads for the 2019 Africa U-20 Cup of Nations were announced on 30 January 2019.

Players marked in bold have been capped at full International level.

Group A

Burundi
Head coach: Joslin Bipfubusa

Niger
Head coach: Ismaïla Tiemoko

Nigeria
Head coach: Paul Aigbogun

South Africa
Head coach: Thabo Senong

Group B

Burkina Faso
Head coach: Séraphin Dargani

Ghana
Head coach: Jimmy Cobblah

Mali
Head coach: Mamoutou Kané

Senegal
Head coach: Youssouph Dabo

References

2019 Africa U-20 Cup of Nations
Africa U-20 Cup of Nations squads